Early House may refer to:

Early House (Petersburg, Kentucky), listed on the NRHP in Boone County, Kentucky
John and Elizabeth McMurn Early House, Earlham, Iowa, listed on the NRHP in Madison County, Iowa
William W. Early House (Brandywine, Maryland), listed on the NRHP in Prince George's County
Jubal A. Early House, Boones Mill, Virginia, listed on the NRHP in Franklin County

See also
Early Hill Plantation, Greensboro, Georgia, listed on the NRHP in Greene County, Georgia